The Williams Aircraft Design Company was an American aircraft manufacturer based in Northridge, California and run by Art Williams. The company specialized in the design of racing aircraft.

Several of Williams products were the result of collaboration with other designers. For instance the Williams-Cangie WC-1 Sundancer was designed with Carl Cangie and won first place at the 1973 Reno Air Races Formula One Class.

The Williams W-17 Stinger design captured second place at the 1973 Reno Air Races in the biplane class.

Aircraft

References

Defunct aircraft manufacturers of the United States
Racing aircraft
Homebuilt aircraft